Rajhena is a market center in Kohalpur Municipality in Banke District in Lumbini Province of south-western Nepal. The former Village was merged to form new municipality on 18 May 2014. At the time of the 1991 Nepal census it had a population of 7,593 and had 1265 houses in the town.

References

Populated places in Banke District